Collectors' Items is a 1956 studio album by Miles Davis. There are two sessions collected on the album with largely different musicians. The first 1953 session is "Compulsion", "The Serpent's Tooth" (two takes) and "'Round About Midnight". The second 1956 session is "In Your Own Sweet Way", "Vierd Blues" and "No Line". The personnel for the first session were Davis, Sonny Rollins and Charlie Parker (credited under the pseudonym "Charlie Chan" due to contractual obligations) on tenor sax, Walter Bishop on piano, Percy Heath on bass and Philly Joe Jones on drums. For the second session, the tenor sax was Rollins alone, the piano was Tommy Flanagan, the bass Paul Chambers and Art Taylor on drums.

According to Ira Gitler's liner notes, the 1953 session was only the second time Parker had recorded on tenor saxophone. The CD edition's liner notes indicate the session was the only time Parker and Rollins recorded together.

Davis describes the session with Parker in his autobiography as having been very chaotic. It was Davis' first session of 1953 and his heroin habit had become very bad. Parker had quit his own heroin habit following the arrest of his trumpet player Red Rodney, instead drinking enormous quantities of alcohol. He consumed a quart of vodka at the rehearsal, then spoke condescendingly to Davis as if it were his session and Davis an employee or a child. After arguing, Parker fell asleep and Davis was so mad he played poorly, which in turn angered Gitler who was producing.

The 1953 session was remained unreleased for several years, during which Parker died (in March 1955) and Davis left Prestige Records for Columbia Records (in 1956). Part of Davis' contractual obligation to Prestige was to record a second session to pair with the 1953 session that would give Prestige enough material for a full album. For the second session, only Rollins returned, and Davis's band included two relative newcomers to the New York jazz scene. Pianist Tommy Flanagan had just moved to New York City a few weeks prior to the Davis recording session, which was his third recording date in the city. Bassist Paul Chambers had moved to the city in 1955 and first recorded in New York in June at a session for Prestige led by trombonist Bennie Green. Chambers first recorded with Davis in October of 1955 for Columbia as part of Davis' regular performing group of the time, which included John Coltrane, Red Garland, and Philly Joe Jones. The Collector's Items session was his third with Davis, and followed the November 1955 session for Miles: The New Miles Davis Quintet.

Track listing
Prestige – PRLP7044:

Personnel

January 30, 1953 session
Miles Davis – trumpet
Sonny Rollins – tenor saxophone
Charlie Parker (as "Charlie Chan") – tenor saxophone
Walter Bishop Jr. – piano
Percy Heath – bass
Philly Joe Jones – drums

March 16, 1956 session
Miles Davis – trumpet
Sonny Rollins – tenor saxophone
Tommy Flanagan – piano
Paul Chambers – bass
Art Taylor – drums

References

Miles Davis albums
Prestige Records albums
1956 albums
Original Jazz Classics albums
Albums produced by Bob Weinstock
Albums produced by Ira Gitler
Albums recorded at Van Gelder Studio